Geobacter bremensis is a gram-negative, metal-reducing species of bacteria. Isolates of this species were initially discovered in samples of mud from ditches in Bremen, Germany. Isolates of the related species Geobacter pelophilus were found in the same source.

Isolates of G. bremensis have been tested for their use in producing electricity.

See also 
 List of bacterial orders
 List of bacteria genera

References

External links
Type strain of Geobacter bremensis at BacDive -  the Bacterial Diversity Metadatabase	

Bacteria described in 1993
Thermodesulfobacteriota